Jennifer Mudge  (born August 16, 1978) is an American television and stage actress.

Stage work
Mudge attended Rhode Island College and trained at Trinity Repertory Company.

Mudge made her screen debut in a 2003 episode of Hack. She made her off-Broadway debut in 2003 at the 59E59 Theaters, in a production of The Stendhal Syndrome by Terrence McNally, starring Richard Thomas and Isabella Rosselini. Since then she has appeared on Broadway in The Philanthropist with Matthew Broderick and Steven Weber, and off-Broadway as Lula in The Dutchman with Dulé Hill; 
Fault Lines
with Josh Lucas and Noah Emmerich; The Geometry of Fire; The Pavilion; Only the End of the World with Michael Emerson; Ooorah! at the Atlantic Theatre Company; The Big Meal at Playwrights Horizons; and Don't Go Gentle with Michael Cristofer.

She played the part of Debra Whitehead in Season 1 of Boss in 2011.

In 2014 she portrayed "Gloria" in the Broadway production of Rocky, an original role written specifically for the production; this was followed by a reunion with Fiasco Theatre in a re-mounted production of Into the Woods in 2014 and 2015 for Roundabout Theatre, reprising the role of "The Witch."  This was followed by the Manhattan Theatre Club production of "Of Good Stock" with Alicia Silverstone.

She married actor Chris Henry Coffey in 2014.

References

External links

Living people
American film actresses
American television actresses
20th-century American actresses
21st-century American actresses
Rhode Island College alumni
1978 births